Pseudoliparis amblystomopsis, or the hadal snailfish, is a species of snailfish from the hadal zone of the Northwest Pacific Ocean, including the Kuril–Kamchatka and Japan Trenches.

These were, at the time, the deepest living fish ever recorded on film. This deepest-water so-called ethereal snailfish remain undescribed, but a close relative found only slightly shallower in the Mariana Trench was described as Pseudoliparis swirei in late 2017.

References

Liparidae
Fish described in 1955
Taxa named by Anatoly Andriyashev